Pietro Tradonico (c. 800 – 13 September 864) was Doge of Venice from 836 to 864. He was, according to tradition, the thirteenth doge, though historically he is only the eleventh. His election broke the power of the Participazio family.

History
An Istrian native, he was perhaps born in the late eighth or early ninth century. His family, originally from Pula, had come to Rialto from Jesolo. He was illiterate and thus signed many state documents with a signum manus. He was a warrior, not an administrator.

At his election in 836 he nominated his son Giovanni as co-regent, continuing the process begun a century earlier of establishing a hereditary dukedom with dynastic succession. All previous attempts had failed and this would turn out no differently.

He fought the Saracens of Bari and Taranto, who had earlier defeated Venice at Sansego, an island south of Pula. He had to deal not only with Saracen pirates, but with Slavs as well. He led a large fleet against in 839 to punish the Narentines (also called Neretvians) for raiding and slaughtering several Venetian traders returning from Benevento in 834–835. He made peace with Duke Mislav of the Croats of Dalmatia and a Narentine prince by the name of Družak (Drosaico, Marianorum judice). His military assault on the Neretvians in 840 failed and he lost more than 100 men and had to return to Venetia. The Neretvians continued to push against him and, in 846, breached Venice itself and raided the neighbouring lagoon city of Caorle.

In 840, the Emperor Lothair I recognised the independence of Venice and its authority over the lagoon as far as the "", i.e., the sea ("salt waters"), already recognised by Byzantium. From the latter he received the titles of spatharius and hypatus.

In Spring 856, Pietro and his son and co-regent Giovanni hosted Emperor Louis II and his wife Engelberga in a three-day visit to Venice. During this visit the Emperor stood godfather to Giovanni's daughter, whose name is not known.

Giovanni died in 863. Pietro himself died a year later on 13 September 864, having been ambushed and attacked by a group of malcontents while returning from vespers at the Church of San Zaccaria. His body was recovered a while later by monks of San Zaccaria, who buried him in the church. Those responsible for his murder were punished accordingly: some were executed, others condemned to exile in France and Constantinople. He was succeeded by Orso Participazio, whose rise to power was perhaps facilitated by the absence of a Tradonico heir.

Sources
Norwich, John Julius. A History of Venice. Alfred A. Knopf: New York, 1982.

800s births
864 deaths
9th-century Doges of Venice
Year of birth uncertain
People from Pula